Akui is a  village in the Indas CD block in the Bishnupur subdivision of the Bankura district in the state of West Bengal, India.

Geography

Location

Note: The map alongside presents some of the notable locations in the subdivision. All places marked in the map are linked in the larger full screen map.

Demographics
According to the 2011 Census of India, Akui had a total population of 6,115, of which 3,118 (51%) were males and 2,997 (49%) were females. There were 603 persons in the age range of 0–6 years. The total number of literate persons in Akui was 4,237 (76.87% of the population over 6 years).

Education
Akui Kamalabala Women's College was established at Akui in 2015. Affiliated with the Bankura University, it offers honours courses in Bengali, English, philosophy and a general course in humanities.

Culture
David J. McCutchion mentions the Radha Kanta temple as a pancha-ratna with ridged rekha turrets and porch on triple archway, brick-built structure with a rich terracotta façade, constructed in 1764.

Healthcare
There is a primary health centre at Akui, with 4 beds.

References

External links

Villages in Bankura district